Muthurwa is a settlement in Kenya's Central Province. It is different from the commonly known muthurwa market,  located in Nairobi's CBD area.

References 

Populated places in Central Province (Kenya)